The 1976–77 Washington Capitals season was the Washington Capitals third season in the National Hockey League (NHL).

This season was much better than the past two seasons, with the Capitals winning 24 games.

Offseason

Regular season

Final standings

Schedule and results

Playoffs
The Capitals missed the playoffs for the third year in a row.

Player statistics

Regular season
Scoring

Goaltending

Note: GP = Games played; G = Goals; A = Assists; Pts = Points; +/- = Plus/minus; PIM = Penalty minutes; PPG=Power-play goals; SHG=Short-handed goals; GWG=Game-winning goals
      MIN=Minutes played; W = Wins; L = Losses; T = Ties; GA = Goals against; GAA = Goals against average; SO = Shutouts;

Awards and records

Transactions

Draft picks
Washington's draft picks at the 1976 NHL Amateur Draft held in Montreal, Quebec.

Farm teams

See also
1976–77 NHL season

References

External links
 

Washington Capitals seasons
Wash
Wash
Washing
Washing